Sons of Kemet are a British jazz group formed by Shabaka Hutchings, Oren Marshall, Seb Rochford, and Tom Skinner. Theon Cross replaced Marshall on tuba after the first album, and Eddie Hick replaced Rochford on drums after the third.

Career 
The group uses saxophone and clarinet (Hutchings), tuba (Cross), and two drummers (Skinner, Hick) to make their music and plays a mixture of jazz, rock, Caribbean folk, and African music.

On 9 September 2013, Sons of Kemet released their debut album Burn, which received the Arts Desk Album of the Year 2013 and a nomination for Gilles Peterson's Album of the Year. Their next album Lest We Forget What We Came Here to Do received the same nomination for the year 2015. The group won Best Jazz Act at the 2013 MOBO Awards.

On 30 March 2018, Impulse! released the band's third album, Your Queen Is a Reptile. It was nominated for the 2018 Mercury Prize.

On 14 May 2021, the fourth album by Sons of Kemet, Black to the Future, was released. Hubert Adjei-Kontoh, writing for Pitchfork, described the album as a "propulsive mind- and body-moving record", while Kitty Empire writing for The Guardian described it as "an eloquent dance between anger and joy" and praised the lyric writing and instrumentals of the album.

On June 1, 2022, they posted that after the current run of shows, "we will closing this chapter of the band's life for the foreseeable future."

Band members 
Current
 Shabaka Hutchings, saxophone and clarinet
 Tom Skinner, drums
 Theon Cross, tuba
 Eddie Hick, drums

Past
 Seb Rochford, drums
 Oren Marshall, tuba

Discography 
 Burn (Naim, 2013)
 Lest We Forget What We Came Here to Do (Naim, 2015)
 Your Queen Is a Reptile (Impulse!, 2018)
 Black to the Future (Impulse!, 2021)

Videography

Awards 
2013 MOBO Awards – Best Jazz Act (Winner)

References

External links 

 
Musical groups from London
Musical groups established in 2011
2011 establishments in England